Ιoannis Apakas (mid 1500s - early 1600s), also known as Johann Apakass was a Greek painter and priest.  He was active in the latter part of the 16th century to the early 17th century. He was popular artist during his time.

His work resembles the Cretan School with a significant Venetian influence which evolved into the Heptanese School.  His works mostly resemble Michael Damaskinos, Georgios Klontzas and Leos Moskos. Some of his works resemble Victor of Crete, Elias Moskos. His style evolved from the maniera greca to a more refined painting style resembling the Cretan School.

Many of his works survived and are featured in public foundations, private collections, churches and monasteries all over the world namely Greece. His most notable work is Ignatius of Antioch. The lions have been used in countless paintings by different artists representing the Cretan School.  Ten of his paintings have survived.

History
Apakas was born in Heraklion in the Republic of Venice. He was a priest and a painter. Not much is known about his life. He continued painting. Artists resembling his work were Philotheos Skoufos, Elias Moskos. A large amount of his art still exists today. He signed most of his work Χειρ ιερέως Ιωάννου. He is one of the forerunners of the Heptanese School.  His works are in the same category as  Michael Damaskinos and Theodore Poulakis.  He began to refine the traditional maniera greca of the Cretan School leading the art movement into the Heptanese School.  Many of his paintings are located in Greece. He also painted the Last Judgement. A theme that was painted by Georgios Klontzas and Leos Moskos. Another common theme between Apakas, Theodore Poulakis and Elias Moskos was the Tree of Jesse. with Jesus or the Virgin

Gallery

Notable works
The Second Coming Greek Institute Venice, Italy
Deesis with Christ, St Andrew and St Paraskevi Ioannis Theologos Monastery Patmos, Greece
The Descent from the Cross Katholikon of Lavra Monastery Mount Athos, Greece

References

Bibliography

Cretan Renaissance painters
17th-century Greek people
17th-century Greek painters
People from Heraklion
16th-century Greek painters
16th-century Greek people
Greek Renaissance humanists